Donatas Kazlauskas (born 31 March 1994) is a Lithuanian professional footballer who plays as a winger for FK Žalgiris and Lithuania national team.

Club career
On 6 January 2015, Kazlauskas joined Lechia Gdańsk on three-and-a-half year contract, but his contract was terminated after two years.

International career

International stats

International goals
Scores and results list Lithuania's goal tally first.

Honours

Club
Žalgiris
Lithuanian Cup: 2011–12

International
Lithuania
Baltic Cup: runner-up 2016

Individual
Young Lithuanian Footballer of the Year: 2014
A Lyga Team of the Year: 2018

References

External links
 
 
 
 

1994 births
Living people
Sportspeople from Kretinga
Lithuanian footballers
Lithuanian expatriate footballers
Lithuania international footballers
Lithuania under-21 international footballers
FK Žalgiris players
FK Atlantas players
Lechia Gdańsk players
Olimpia Grudziądz players
FK Riteriai players
FC Lviv players
LPS HD Clinceni players
A Lyga players
I Lyga players
Ekstraklasa players
I liga players
Ukrainian Premier League players
Liga I players
Expatriate footballers in Poland
Lithuanian expatriate sportspeople in Poland
Expatriate footballers in Ukraine
Lithuanian expatriate sportspeople in Ukraine
Expatriate footballers in Romania
Lithuanian expatriate sportspeople in Romania
Association football midfielders